The Northern Baja deer mouse (Peromyscus fraterculus) is a species of deer mouse native to Southern California and the Baja California peninsula as well as several islands in the Gulf of California. P. fraterculus was previously considered a subspecies of the cactus mouse (Peromyscus eremicus) prior to a 2000 study which identified genetic differences and suggested P. fraterculus is more closely related to Eva's desert mouse (P. eva) than to P. eremicus.

References

Peromyscus
Mammals of Mexico
Mammals of the United States
Rodents of North America
Fauna of the California chaparral and woodlands
Fauna of the Baja California Peninsula
Fauna of Gulf of California islands
Natural history of Baja California
Natural history of the Peninsular Ranges
Least concern biota of Mexico
Mammals described in 1892